Tan Chin Hwee (born 1971) is a Singaporean businessman and professor. He is the current Asia-Pacific chief executive officer of Trafigura and the first Asian to hold this position in the company. A Chartered Financial Analyst and Certified Public Accountant in Singapore and Australia, he previously worked in DBS Bank, Keppel Corporation, Amaranth Advisors and Apollo Global Management before joining Trafigura.

Education
Tan attended Hwa Chong Junior College. He graduated in 1995 with a Bachelor of Accountancy from Nanyang Technological University (NTU). During his days in NTU, he was the president of the university's Mensa club and the president of the university's Photovideographic Society 

He also obtained a Master of Business Administration in 2003 from Yale University and completed a postgraduate course at Harvard University's John F. Kennedy School of Government in 2011. He is a Chartered Financial Analyst and a Certified Public Accountant (CPA) in Singapore and Australia.

Business career
Tan started his career in 1995 at Keppel Corporation's treasury division, where he traded proprietary Asian equities and fixed income. Between 1999 and 2001, he ran the proprietary credit portfolio for DBS Bank before becoming a managing director at Amaranth Advisors. After leaving Amaranth Advisors, he joined Apollo Global Management and founded its Asian operations. In 2015, Tan announced his retirement from the finance industry. He is currently the Asia-Pacific CEO of Trafigura, a Global Fortune 500 company, and the first Asian to hold this position. In 2019, Trafigura was the largest amongst the only three Singapore companies to appear in the Fortune Global 500 list and it ranked top 22 globally.

Tan has sat on the boards of various organisations in the public and private sectors. The positions he held include: member of the Resource Panel for Government Parliamentary Committee for Finance and Trade and Industry; member of the Advisory Panel for Youth Corps Singapore; member of the Advisory Panel for the Ministry of Education; member of the Advisory Panel for the Ministry of Culture, Community and Youth; board member of Lien Aid Limited (Singapore), the endowment fund for KK Women's and Children's Hospital; advisory board member of Shanghai Jiao Tong University's Shanghai Advanced Institute of Finance; board member of Singapore Press Holdings; non-executive and independent director of Keppel REIT (until June 2017); member of Nanyang Technological University's board of trustees; member of Hwa Chong Institution executive committee board; member of Grab Inc advisory board; member of the Monetary Authority of Singapore's Finance Centre Advisory Panel; and member of the Maritime and Port Authority of Singapore's International Maritime Centre (IMC) 2030 Advisory Committee. Tan was the judge for the Best CEO Award for Singapore Corporate Award and the judge for the Ernst and Young Entrepreneur of the Year Award.

He currently sits on the Hwa Chong Institution EXCO of Board of Governors as well as EXCO of Board of Directors. He wrote an article on 自强不息的华中精神 which was published on 22 March 2019.

Recently in the press statement, Tan said ICC TradeFlow is the first to be powered by the TradeTrust network. "This is a Singaporean take on how to successfully adopt global trade finance technology under the leadership of governmental stakeholders," 

In May 2020, Tan has been appointed to join the Emerging Stronger Taskforce (EST) set up under the Future Economy Council (FEC). The government-led taskforce consisted of key industry representatives to review how Singapore can build new sources of dynamism and stay economically resilient in a post-COVID-19 world.
 Tan co-led the Emerging Stronger Taskforce's Alliance for Action on Supply Chain Digitalisation and EduTech, and is also a member of the Sustainability working group. Recently, the Alliance for Action on EduTech has come up with four initiatives to position the country as a global talent hub in the field, with the aim to support Singaporeans in their skills acquisition and career pathways in order to be better prepared for current challenges and to embrace new opportunities.

Tan was nominated as a member of the Trade & Connectivity Standards Committee under the Singapore Standards Council (SSC) which facilitates the development, promotion and review of standards in Singapore.

Tan has been an Academy Member of the Global Teacher Prize since inception 2013 and is involved as a judge to give out the US$1 million “Nobel” teaching prize.

Family office 
Tan is an active investor in technology and makes personal investments through his family office vehicle.  Tan is an early investor in South Korea's largest e-commerce company, Coupang. In 2018, Coupang raised $2 billion from SoftBank Vision Fund valuing the company at $9 billion.

Academic career
Tan and Thomas R. Robinson, the president and CEO of AACSB International, co-wrote Asian Financial Statement Analysis: Detecting Financial Irregularities, which was published in April 2014 by Wiley. The Chinese version of the book was launched in Shanghai in 2015, and copies were sold out upon release.
In December 2020, Tan published his second book, Values at the Core, co-authored with Thomas Grandjean, which explores the role of human values in making societies prosperous and went on to be listed as one of the Financial Times readers' Best 2021 Summer Books.

Tan is an adjunct professor at Nanyang Technological University (his alma mater), Shanghai Jiao Tong University, Singapore Management University and the University of Yale. He has also taken on the International Olympic Committee Financial Advisor role from March 2016 to December 2019.

Awards and accolades
Tan received the Distinguished Financial Industry Certified Professional Award from the Singapore government in 2013. In 2014, he was honoured as a World Economic Forum Young Global Leader and World Cities Summit Young Leader, and received the Nanyang Alumni Award from Nanyang Technological University, his alma mater. In 2015, he received the World Outstanding Young Chinese Entrepreneurs Award from business newspaper Yazhou Zhoukan and the World Federation of Chinese Entrepreneurs Organization. He was also voted by The Hedge Fund Journal as the emerging top 40 absolute return investors globally and recognised by The Asset for managing the Best Asia Credit Hedge Fund. He was honoured as a World Economic Forum Young Global Leader in 2010.

Tan received a gold medal award from the Community Chest on behalf of Trafigura Foundation at the Istana on 9 October 2019.  He has always been supporting Trafigura Foundation’s continuous support towards the community in Singapore.

Community involvement
Tan is actively involved in social work since university days. Some of the social initiatives that Tan has been involved with include: Setting up the Premmies Fund with the KK Women's and Children's Hospital to help parents with premature babies cope with the financial burden; Working with ComChest and NCSS to pilot a quarterly donor engagement series for high net worth individuals looking to make a social impact. He believes strongly in paying it forward, and is one of the donors to the NTU Priorities Fund, which supports 400 of NTU's neediest students. Recipients of the fund will pledge to "pay it forward" within two years of graduation and return the interest-free cash assistance to the university, making it an "evergreen fund". He has supported the ComChest "You'll Never Walk Alone" fundraising campaign. Campaign funds raised from the campaign will go towards over 80 social service agencies supported by ComChest to empower lives of the vulnerable, adults with disabilities, children with special needs and youth-at-risk, families in need, vulnerable seniors and persons with mental health conditions during these difficult times.

Personal life 
Tan grew up with his parents and two siblings in a one-room apartment in Toa Payoh. He now lives with his wife and three children. Tan is an avid fan of Premier League football club Liverpool F.C.

References

Living people
1971 births
Singaporean business executives
Singaporean investors
Singaporean writers
DBS Bank people
Hwa Chong Junior College alumni
Nanyang Technological University alumni
Yale University alumni
Harvard Kennedy School alumni
CFA charterholders
Apollo Global Management people
Academic staff of Nanyang Technological University
Academic staff of Singapore Management University
Academic staff of Shanghai Jiao Tong University
Yale University faculty